Dialpad Meetings is a cloud-based video conferencing system from Dialpad, a privately held company in San Francisco, California. The company, formerly known as Firespotter Labs, was co-founded by Craig Walker one year after he was the first Entrepreneur-in-Residence at Google Ventures. Prior to the launch of UberConference, Firespotter launched a restaurant seating application called NoshList.

History
UberConference was launched in May 2012 at TechCrunch Disrupt, the annual trade conference run by technology news source TechCrunch. UberConference was chosen as the best new product from a group of 30 startup entrants.

UberConference’s development was funded by an initial investment of $3 million in Firespotter from Google Ventures, and another $15 million in the fall of 2013 by Andreessen Horowitz and Google Ventures. It is also a portfolio company of Kleiner Perkins Caufield & Byers Currently, UberConference employs over 60 full-time workers spread across offices in San Francisco, CA, San Jose, CA, and Raleigh, NC.

The team is composed of former Google Voice (previously GrandCentral) and Yahoo! Voice (previously Dialpad) employees.

On June 30, 2022, UberConference officially joined the Dialpad family of products and was renamed to Dialpad Meetings.

Features
A number of features have been added, including screen sharing and file sharing (which allows users to share the image of their own screen with other callers), as well as integration into a number of Google Apps, including Google Hangouts.

References

Computer-related introductions in 2012
Communication software
Videotelephony